George Rogers Clark Stuart (August 31, 1924 – August 23, 2008) was an American attorney and politician. He served as President of the Virginia Bar Association from 1968 to 1969, after which he was elected as a Democrat to the Virginia House of Delegates, where he served two terms. He was married to the former Mary Elizabeth Baker, the first wife of Congressman William C. Wampler.

References

External links 
 

1924 births
2008 deaths
People from Abingdon, Virginia
Democratic Party members of the Virginia House of Delegates
Alumni of Balliol College, Oxford
University of Virginia School of Law alumni
Williams College alumni
20th-century American politicians